Al-Mukafih (meaning 'The Fighter' in English) was an Arabic-language communist weekly newspaper published from Casablanca, Morocco.

History and profile
Ali Yata was the head of Al Mukafih which was the organ of the Moroccan Communist Party. It was edited by Abdallah Layachi.

The paper was published weekly until 1964 when it became a daily.

The paper continued to be published after the Moroccan Communist Party had been banned in 1960. On 17 June 1961 the weekly was banned in Iraq due to its alleged attacks on the policies of the country.

Several editions of Al Mukafih were seized by the government in mid-1964. The newspaper was finally banned on 31 October 1964 (on the grounds that the Moroccan Communist Party itself was non-existent). In March 1965 a new (supposedly independent) weekly newspaper was launched, al-Kifah al-Watani with Ali Yata as its editor.

References

1964 disestablishments in Morocco
Arabic communist newspapers
Communism in Morocco
Defunct newspapers published in Morocco
Defunct weekly newspapers
Mass media in Casablanca
Publications disestablished in 1964
Publications with year of establishment missing